David Johnstone Pryde (3 March 1890 – 2 August 1959) was a Scottish Labour politician.

The youngest son of Matthew James John Maitland Pryde, of Gorebridge, Midlothian, he was educated at Lasswade Secondary School and at the Scottish Labour College.

He worked as a colliery clerk and as a miners' trade union official.  From 1927 until 1932, he was president of the West Lothian Mineworkers Union, and from 1923 until 1933, he served on the national executive of the National Union of Scottish Mineworkers. He was elected to Bonnyrigg and Lasswade Town Council in 1938, and twice served as election agent to Joseph Westwood.

He was the unsuccessful Labour candidate for Peebles and South Midlothian in 1935, but was elected for that seat in 1945. Following the boundary changes, he sat for the short-lived seat of Midlothian and Peebles from 1950 until 1955,and then for Midlothian from 1955 until his death in August 1959. The seat remained vacant until the general election in October 1959.

References

External links

1890 births
1959 deaths
Scottish Labour MPs
Members of the Parliament of the United Kingdom for Scottish constituencies
National Union of Mineworkers-sponsored MPs
UK MPs 1945–1950
UK MPs 1950–1951
UK MPs 1951–1955
UK MPs 1955–1959
People from Midlothian
People educated at Lasswade High School Centre
Scottish miners
Scottish trade unionists
20th-century British businesspeople